Nancy Ruth Landry, also known as Nancy L. Matthews (born June 10, 1962), is an American politician who served as a member of the Louisiana House of Representatives for the 31st district from 2008 to 2019.

Early life and education
Landry was born in Japan while her father was serving in the United States Navy. She earned a Bachelor of Arts degree in psychology from Louisiana State University in 1985 and a Juris Doctor from the Paul M. Hebert Law Center in 1990.

Career
Landry was elected to the Louisiana House of Representatives in November 2007 and assumed office in January 2008.

On May 19, 2015, Landry, a former independent, was one of four Republicans on the House Civil Law and Procedure Committee who voted to table on a 10–2 vote the proposed Marriage and Conscience Act, authored by Republican Representative Mike Johnson of Bossier Parish.

Considered a Moderate Republican, Landry was the chair of the House Education Committee in 2017. In that capacity, she supported legislation by African-American State Representative Barbara Norton of Shreveport to ban corporal punishment in all Louisiana public schools, but the measure was defeated by a vote of 61–34..

Landry won reelection in the nonpartisan blanket primary held on October 24, 2015. She received 10,005 votes (84.7 percent) to Democrat Evan H. Wright's 1,890 ballots (15.3 percent).

Landry resigned from the House seven months prior to the expiration of her third term to become the chief of staff in the office of Secretary of State Kyle Ardoin. She was succeeded by Jonathan Goudeau.

External links 
Nancy Landry Campaign

References

1962 births
Living people
Louisiana lawyers
Louisiana Independents
Louisiana Republicans
Members of the Louisiana House of Representatives
Women state legislators in Louisiana
Women in Louisiana politics
Political chiefs of staff
Politicians from Lafayette, Louisiana
Louisiana State University alumni
Louisiana State University Law Center alumni
21st-century American politicians
21st-century American women politicians